11/12/13: Live in Melbourne is a live album by Kieran Kane and Kevin Welch, recorded at The Continental, Melbourne, Australia on November 12–13, 1999. They played unaccompanied, using acoustic guitars and mandolin. Most of the songs are original compositions either written or co-written by Kane or Welch. The two exceptions are covers of John Hiatt's "Train to Birmingham" and Hank Williams' "Ramblin' Man."

Critical reception

Richie Unterberger of AllMusic writes, "There's an informal, playing-before-friends feel to the performances, on tunes that are mostly good-natured and easygoing."

The review at No Depression concludes with, "Both singers are probably better presented on their own discs, but 11/12/13 allows for a worthy examination of two fine artists in a rare, no-pressure setting. Think of it as a pair of cool guys trading off playing songs for you in your living room, and it comes out a winner."

Robert Wooldridge of Country Standard Time begins his review with, "Recorded on November 12th and 13th, 1999 (thus the title), this live acoustic set is reminiscent of the VH1 Storytellers performance by Johnny Cash and Willie Nelson-two singer/songwriters with their guitars trading off songs."

Track listing
Track information and credits taken from the album's liner notes.

Musicians
Kieran Kane: Vocals, Mandolin, Guitar
Kevin Welch: Vocals, Guitar

References

External links
Kieran Kane Official Site
Kevin Welch Official Site
Dead Reckoning Records Official Site

2000 live albums
Dead Reckoning Records albums
Kevin Welch albums
Kieran Kane albums